Didier Decoin (born 13 March 1945) is a French screenwriter and writer awarded the Prix Goncourt in 1977.

Biography 
He is the son of filmmaker Henri Decoin. He began his career as a newspaper journalist at France Soir, Le Figaro and VOD, and radio Europe 1. At the same time he started writing.

While continuing his writing, he became writer in film and television (and adapted scripts for television as the major TV films Les Misérables, The Count of Monte Cristo, Balzac and Napoleon).

In 1995, he became the Secretary of the Académie Goncourt.

Bibliography

Novels
 Le Procès à l'Amour (Seuil, 1966) (Bourse Del Duca). See 
 La Mise au monde (Seuil, 1967)
 Laurence (Seuil, 1969)
 Elisabeth ou Dieu seul le sait (Seuil, 1970) (prix des Quatre Jurys)
 Abraham de Brooklyn (Seuil, 1971) (prix des Libraires)
 Ceux qui vont s'aimer (Seuil, 1973)
 Un policeman (Seuil, 1975)
 John l'Enfer (Seuil, 1977) (Prix Goncourt
  Le bureau des jardins et des étangs' (Stock,2017)
 La Dernière Nuit (Balland, 1978)
 L'Enfant de la mer de Chine (Seuil, 1981 )
 Les Trois vies de Babe Ozouf (Seuil, 1983)
 Autopsie d'une étoile (Seuil, 1987)
 Meurtre à l'anglaise (Mercure de France, 1988)
 La Femme de chambre du Titanic (Seuil, 1991) - basis for the 1997 film The Chambermaid on the Titanic Docile (Seuil, 1994)
 La Promeneuse d'oiseaux (Seuil, 1996)
 La Route de l'aéroport (Fayard, 1997)
 Louise (Seuil, 1998)
 Madame Seyerling (Seuil, 2002)
 Avec vue sur la Mer (Nil Editions, 2005), Prix du Cotentin 2005, Prix Livre & Mer Henri-Queffélec 2006
 Henri ou Henry: le roman de mon père (Stock, mai 2006)
 Est-ce ainsi que les femmes meurent (Grasset, février 2009)
  Le bureau des jardins et des étangs (Stock, 2017)

Essays
 Il fait Dieu (Julliard 1975, Fayard 1997)
 La Nuit de l'été (with film by J.C. Brialy, Balland 1979)
 La Bible racontée aux enfants (Calmann-Levy)
 Il était une joie... Andersen (Ramsay, 1982)
 Béatrice en enfer (Lieu Commun, 1984 )
 L'Enfant de Nazareth (with Marie-Hélène About, Nouvelle Cité, 1989)
 Elisabeth Catez ou l'Obsession de Dieu (Balland, 1991), Prix de littérature religieuse 1992
 Lewis et Alice (Laffont, 1992)
 Jésus, le Dieu qui riait (Stock, 1999)
 "Dictionnaire amoureux de la Bible"

Collaborative works
 La Hague, with Natacha Hochman (photography) (Isoète, 1991)
 Cherbourg, with Natacha Hochman (photography) (Isoète, 1992)
 Presqu'île de lumière, with Patrick Courault (photography) (Isoète, 1996)
 Sentinelles de lumière, with Jean-Marc Coudour (photography) (Desclée de Brouwer, 1997)

Screenplays
 La Merveilleuse Visite (dir. Marcel Carné, 1973)
 La Bible (dir. Marcel Carné, 1976)
 I as in Icarus (dir. Henri Verneuil, 1979)
 L'Indic (dir. Serge Leroy, 1983)
  (dir. Robert Enrico, 1987)
 Un bon petit diable (dir. Jean-Claude Brialy)
 L'homme voilé (dir. Maroun Bagdadi, 1987)
 Dancing Machine (dir. Gilles Béhat, 1990)
 Out of Life (dir. Maroun Bagdadi, 1991)
 Des feux mal éteints (dir. Serge Moati, 1994)
 Jakob the Liar (dir. Peter Kassovitz, 1999)
 The Count of Monte Cristo (dir. Josée Dayan, 1999, TV miniseries)
  (dir. Josée Dayan, 1999, TV miniseries)
 Le Roi danse (dir. Gérard Corbiau (2000)
 Les Misérables'' (dir. Josée Dayan, 2000, TV miniseries)

External links
"Didier Decoin", Academie Goncourt
Ina Télé Archives

1945 births
Living people
People from Boulogne-Billancourt
French Roman Catholic writers
French male screenwriters
French screenwriters
Writers from Île-de-France
Prix Goncourt winners
French male non-fiction writers
Prix des libraires winners